Hasrat is a popular name predominantly used in Indian subcontinent. It is also a popular pen name for Urdu poets in India and Pakistan. It's an  Urdu word, meaning "wish" or "desire". Notable Urdu poets that use this pen name include: Muhammad Abdul Qadeer Siddiqi Qadri 'Hasrat' (1871–1962), Hasrat Jaipuri (1922-1977) and Hasrat Mohani (1875-1951).

An Indian revolutionary Ashfaqulla Khan (1900-1927) also used to write Urdu poetry with this pen name; the full name of Ashfaq was Mohammad Ashfaqulla Khan Warsi 'Hasrat'. His popular couplet "zindagi (زندگی ) baad-e-fanaa tujhko milegii 'Hasrat', Teraa jiinaa tere marne ki badault hogaa." (en: O Hasrat! thou would get real life after thy death, Thou shall live in the hearts of people after thy sacrifice.)

References

Pseudonymous writers
Urdu-language words and phrases
Urdu-language poets from India